Sylvan Pass (el. ) is a mountain pass located in the Absaroka Range in Yellowstone National Park in Wyoming. The pass provides access to the park from the east entrance.

The pass was named after nearby Sylvan Lake (derived from medieval Latin sylvānus, from Latin Silvānus, god of the woods, from silva, forest), and was formed by frost action breaking the rocks.  The park road through the pass was closed during winter but is now open to visitors throughout winter.  The road is maintained to allow access via snowmobile, snow coach, and cross-country skiing.  In the 2007–08 season it cost the parks service in excess of $200,000 to keep it open and avalanche control measures were put in place.

The Sylvan Pass route is the only way to enter/exit Yellowstone National Park from the East Entrance.

Sylvan Pass is the low point of the saddle between Hoyt Peak and Top Notch Peak.

The original road through the pass was designed by Captain Hiram Chittenden of the Army Corps of Engineers.

Notes

Mountain passes of Wyoming
Landforms of Park County, Wyoming
Landforms of Yellowstone National Park
Transportation in Park County, Wyoming